The Babylonian calendar was a lunisolar calendar with years consisting of 12 lunar months, each beginning when a new crescent moon was first sighted low on the western horizon at sunset, plus an intercalary month inserted as needed by decree. The calendar is based on a Sumerian (Third Dynasty of Ur) predecessor preserved in the Umma calendar of  Shulgi (c. 21st century BC).

Months 
The year begins in spring, and is divided into 12 months. The word for "month" was arḫu (construct state araḫ). The chief deity of the Assyrians is assigned the surplus intercalary month, showing that the calendar originates in Babylonian, and not later Assyrian times.

During the 6th century BC Babylonian captivity of the Jews, the Babylonian month names were adopted into the Hebrew calendar. In Iraq and the Levant the Gregorian solar calendar is used with these names replacing the Latin ones as Arabic names of Roman months. These were inspired by the Ottoman Rumi calendar, itself derived from the Roman Julian solar calendar. Despite appropriating the mere Babylonian names, their months are not equivalent to those of the Hebrew and Babylonian lunisolar calendar.

Until the 5th century BC, the calendar was fully observational, but beginning about 499 BC the months began to be regulated by a lunisolar cycle of 19 years equaling 235 months. Although usually called the Metonic cycle after Meton of Athens (432 BC), Meton probably learned of the cycle from the Babylonians. After no more than three isolated exceptions, by 380 BC the months of the calendar were regulated by the cycle without exception. In the cycle of 19 years, the month Adaru 2 was intercalated, except in the year that was number 17 in the cycle, when the month Ulūlu 2 was inserted. During this period, the first day of each month (beginning at sunset) continued to be the day when a new crescent moon was first sighted—the calendar never used a specified number of days in any month.

Days 
Counting from the new moon, the Babylonians celebrated every seventh day as a "holy-day", also called an "evil-day" (meaning "unsuitable" for prohibited activities). On these days officials were prohibited from various activities and common men were forbidden to "make a wish", and at least the 28th was known as a "rest-day". On each of them, offerings were made to a different god and goddess, apparently at nightfall to avoid the prohibitions: Marduk and Ishtar on the 7th, Ninlil and Nergal on the 14th, Sin and Shamash on the 21st, and Enki and Mah on the 28th. Tablets from the sixth-century BC reigns of Cyrus the Great and Cambyses II indicate these dates were sometimes approximate. The lunation of 29 or 30 days basically contained three seven-day weeks, and a final week of eight or nine days inclusive, breaking the continuous seven-day cycle.

Among other theories of Shabbat origin, the Universal Jewish Encyclopedia of Isaac Landman advanced a theory of Assyriologists like Friedrich Delitzsch that Shabbat originally arose from the lunar cycle, containing four weeks ending in Sabbath, plus one or two additional unreckoned days per month. The difficulties of this theory include reconciling the differences between an unbroken week and a lunar week, and explaining the absence of texts naming the lunar week as Shabbat in any language.

The rarely attested Sapattum or Sabattum as the full moon is cognate or merged with Hebrew Shabbat, but is monthly rather than weekly; it is regarded as a form of Sumerian sa-bat ("mid-rest"), attested in Akkadian as um nuh libbi ("day of mid-repose"). According to Marcello Craveri, Sabbath "was almost certainly derived from the Babylonian Shabattu, the festival of the full moon, but, all trace of any such origin having been lost, the Hebrews ascribed it to Biblical legend." This conclusion is a contextual restoration of the damaged Enûma Eliš creation account, which is read as: "[Sa]bbath shalt thou then encounter, mid[month]ly."

See also

Lunisolar calendars 
 Hebrew calendar
 Ancient Macedonian calendar

Other systems 
 Assyrian calendar
 Mandaean calendar
 Persian calendar
 Islamic calendar
 Solar Hijri calendar

 Pre-Islamic Arabian calendar
 Babylonian astrology
 Babylonian astronomy
 Arabic names of Gregorian months
 MUL.APIN
 Egyptian, Coptic, and Ethiopian calendars
 Zoroastrian and Armenian calendars
 Turkish months

References

Notes

Citations

Bibliography 
Parker, Richard Anthony and Waldo H. Dubberstein. Babylonian Chronology 626 BC.–AD. 75. Providence, RI: Brown University Press, 1956.
W. Muss-Arnolt, The Names of the Assyro-Babylonian Months and Their Regents, Journal of Biblical Literature (1892).
Sacha Stern, "The Babylonian Calendar at Elephantine" in Zeitschrift für Papyrologie und Epigraphik 130 (2000) 159–171 (PDF document, 94 KB)
Fales, Frederick Mario, “A List of Umma Month Names”, Revue d’assyriologie et d’archéologie orientale, 76 (1982), 70–71.
 Gomi, Tohru, “On the Position of the Month iti-ezem-dAmar-dSin in the Neo-Sumerian Umma Calendar”, Zeitschrift für Assyriologie und Vorderasiatische Archäologie, 75 (1985), 4–6.
 Pomponio, Francesco, “The Reichskalender of Ur III in the Umma Texts”, Zeitschrift für Assyriologie und Vorderasiastische Archäologie, 79 (1989), 10–13.
 Verderame, Lorenzo, “Le calendrier et le compte du temps dans la pensée mythique suméro-akkadienne”, De Kêmi à Birit Nâri, Revue Internationale de l'Orient Ancien, 3 (2008), 121–134.
 Steele, John M., ed., "Calendars and Years: Astronomy and Time in the Ancient Near East", Oxford: Oxbow, 2007.

External links 
The Babylonian Ritual Calendar
The Mul.Apin Tablets
Structure of the Babylonian calendar
The Babylonian Calendar (with a date converter based on Parker & Dubberstein (1971))

Obsolete calendars
Calendar
Lunisolar calendars